Malavan in Iran may refer to:
 Malavan, Fars (ملوان - Malavān)
 Malavan, Gilan (مالوان - Mālavān)